Ludwigsburg is an electoral constituency (German: Wahlkreis) represented in the Bundestag. It elects one member via first-past-the-post voting. Under the current constituency numbering system, it is designated as constituency 265. It is located in central Baden-Württemberg, comprising the southern part of the Ludwigsburg district.

Ludwigsburg was created for the inaugural 1949 federal election. Since 2009, it has been represented by Steffen Bilger of the Christian Democratic Union (CDU).

Geography
Ludwigsburg is located in central Baden-Württemberg. As of the 2021 federal election, it comprises the municipalities of Asperg, Ditzingen, Eberdingen, Gerlingen, Hemmingen, Korntal-Münchingen, Kornwestheim, Ludwigsburg, Markgröningen, Möglingen, Oberriexingen, Remseck am Neckar, Schwieberdingen, Sersheim, and Vaihingen an der Enz from the Ludwigsburg district, as well as the municipality of Weissach from the Böblingen district.

History
Ludwigsburg was created in 1949. In the 1949 election, it was Württemberg-Baden Landesbezirk Württemberg constituency 3 in the numbering system. In the 1953 through 1961 elections, it was number 165. In the 1965 through 1976 elections, it was number 167. In the 1980 through 1998 elections, it was number 169. In the 2002 and 2005 elections, it was number 266. Since the 2009 election, it has been number 265.

Originally, the constituency was coterminous with the Ludwigsburg district. In the 1976 election, it comprised the northern part of the Ludwigsburg district. In the 1980 election, it acquired a configuration very similar to its current borders, but lacking the Weissach municipality from the Böblingen district. It acquired the Weissach municipality in the 2017 election.

Members
The constituency was first represented by Willi Lausen of the Social Democratic Party (SPD) from 1949 to 1953, followed by fellow SPD member Karl Mommer from 1953 to 1957. Raban Adelmann of the Christian Democratic Union (CDU) won it in 1957 and served one term before former member Mommer was re-elected in 1961. He served until 1969, when Annemarie Griesinger of the CDU was elected. Gunter Huonker of the SPD was then elected in 1972 for one term. Matthias Wissmann of the CDU was representative from 1976 to 2009, a total of nine consecutive terms. Steffen Bilger was elected in 2009, and re-elected in 2013, 2017, and 2021.

Election results

2021 election

2017 election

2013 election

2009 election

References

Federal electoral districts in Baden-Württemberg
1949 establishments in West Germany
Constituencies established in 1949
Ludwigsburg (district)
Böblingen (district)